The Scottish Women's Cup is the national knockout cup competition for women's football in Scotland. First held in 1970–71, the competition is owned and managed by Scottish Women's Football (SWF), an affiliated body of the Scottish Football Association (SFA).

The Scottish Women's Cup is open to all senior teams affiliated with SWF. Celtic are the current holders.

Format

The competition consists of a preliminary round and then six rounds of which the last one is the final. The twelve teams from the Scottish Women's Premier League enter at the second round. Thus all other teams are drawn either in the preliminary round or the first round so that 40 teams play in the first round. The 20 winners plus the 12 Premier League teams then play the second round, the round of 32. All rounds are played over a single leg.

List of winners
The finals of the cup have been:

References

External links
"Scottish Women's Cup - Past Winners (1996–2017)", SFA (Web Archive)
Cup at women.soccerway.com
Scottish Cup section at Scottish Women's Football
Competition results 1993-date at SFHA

 
Sco
1